Kosmos 2176 ( meaning Cosmos 2176) was a Russian US-K early warning satellite which was launched in 1992 as part of the Russian Space Forces' Oko programme. The satellite was designed to identify missile launches using optical telescopes and infrared sensors.

Kosmos 2176 was launched from Site 43/3 at Plesetsk Cosmodrome in Russia. A Molniya-M carrier rocket with a 2BL upper stage was used to perform the launch, which took place at 01:18 UTC on 24 January 1992. The launch successfully placed the satellite into a molniya orbit. It subsequently received its Kosmos designation, and the international designator 1992-003A. The United States Space Command assigned it the Satellite Catalog Number 21847.

It re-entered the Earth's atmosphere on January 17, 2012.

See also

List of Kosmos satellites (2001–2250)
List of R-7 launches (1990–1994)
1992 in spaceflight

References

Kosmos satellites
Spacecraft launched in 1992
Spacecraft which reentered in 2012
Oko